The 2022 Lausitzring DTM round was a motor racing event for the Deutsche Tourenwagen Masters held between 21–22 May 2022. The event, part of the 36th season of the DTM, was held at the Lausitzring in Germany.

Results

Race 1

Qualifying

Race

Race 2

Qualifying

Race

Championship standings

Drivers Championship

Teams Championship

Manufacturers Championship

 Note: Only the top five positions are included for three sets of standings.

References

External links
Official website

|- style="text-align:center"
|width="35%"|Previous race:
|width="30%"|Deutsche Tourenwagen Masters2022 season
|width="40%"|Next race:

Lausitzring DTM
Lausitzring DTM